Low density lipoprotein receptor-related protein 3 (LRP-3) is a protein that in humans is encoded by the LRP3 gene.

References

Further reading